Yossi Beinart (1956 – 2017) was CEO of the Tel Aviv Stock Exchange, from 2014 until his death in 2017.

Early life and education 
Beinart was born in Jerusalem, the son of Hebrew University historian Haim Beinart. He served in the Israeli Defense Forces, where he was promoted to lieutenant colonel. He graduated from Hebrew University in 1985, with a degree in Computer Science.

References 

1956 births
2017 deaths
Israeli economists
Tel Aviv Stock Exchange
People from Jerusalem